Gana-Sangha (Sanskrit: गणसङ्घ) or Gana-Rajya (Sanskrit: गणराज्य) were democratic states in ancient India.

Definition

The word  (Sanskrit: गण) in Sanskrit and Pali means tribe. It can also be used to refer to a body of attendants and can refer to any assemblage or association of men formed for the attainment of the same aims, denotes the gathering of a given community. The word sangha in Sanskrit means association, assembly, company or community. For instance, in Buddhism, sangha refers to the monastic community of bhikkhus (monks) and bhikkhunis (nuns).

The phrase gana sangha can be translated as (rule by) tribal assembly. In ancient Buddhist texts like the Anguttara Nikaya which make frequent reference to the great states in ancient India, the texts often use the phrase to refer a type of oligarchical rule, contrast to monarchy (साम्राज्य saamarajya in Sanskrit).

Among the Mahajanapadas, the sixteen great states in ancient India, two followed the gana sangha rule: Vajji and Mallakas. Many smaller states and tribes near these great states also had the gana sangha form of government, such as the Koliyas, and the Shakyas, the small tribal state which Gautama Buddha was born to.

The gana sanghas were generally located in the periphery of the major ancient Indian states, both geographically and culturally, and tend to occupy the higher ground near the Himalayas. The gana sanghas of Vajji, Malla, Koliya, and Shakya mentioned above all situated at the foothills of Himalayas, near eastern Uttar Pradesh, Bihar, Terai region of Nepal. In contrast, the states which followed a monarchical government (saamarajya) were generally located in the flood plains of the Ganges.

Institution
According to the Buddhist sources, key characteristics of the gana sangha seem to include a monarch (raja), and a deliberative assembly (sangha). Elected by the gana sangha, the monarch apparently always belonged to a family of the noble class of Kshatriya Varna. The monarch coordinated his activities with the assembly; in some states, he did so with a council of other nobles. The assembly met regularly, and would discuss all major state decisions. This body also had full financial, administrative, and judicial authority. Other officers, who rarely receive any mention, obeyed the decisions of the assembly. 

The general make-up of the gana sanghas was either that of a single clan (e.g. Shakya), or a confederacy of clans (e.g. Vajji). Most of the gana sanghas are aristocratic in nature: For instance, the Licchavis, the ruling clan of Vajji, had a primary governing body of 7,077 rajas, the heads of the most important families. On the other hand, the smaller state of Shakyas and Koliyas, during the period around Gautama Buddha, had the assembly open to all men, rich and poor.

Historical records
The gana sanghas in India it is generally believed existed as early as the 6th century BC, and persisted in some areas until the 4th century. The ancient Buddhist texts provide many accounts of the various ancient Indian states at the time of the Buddha, including their forms of governments and political workings. Among the larger Mahajanapadas, Mallas, centered in the city of Kusinagara, and the Vajji (or Vṛji) confederation, centered in the city of Vaishali, existed as early as the 6th century BC, and both of their administrations were divided into executive, judicial, and military functions. Even in the other kingdoms of the  Mahajanapadas, their monarchical rule would also include republican communities such as the community of Rajakumara, The villages at this era also had their own assemblies under their local chiefs called Gramakas.

The Arthashastra, an ancient Indian handbook for monarchs on how to rule efficiently, sometimes referred to as "The Prince of Ancient India", also contains a chapter on how to deal with the sanghas (assemblies), which includes injunctions on manipulating the noble leaders. Yet the chapter does not mention how to influence the mass of the citizens, indicating that the gana sangha is more of an aristocratic or oligarchical body, rather than democracy in a modern or even Athenian sense.

Outside Indian sources, Diodorus, a Greek historian who wrote two centuries after the time of Alexander the Great's invasion of India (now Pakistan and northwest India) mentions, without offering any detail, that independent and democratic states existed in India. Modern scholars note the word democracy at the time of the 3rd century BC and later suffered from degradation and could mean any autonomous state, no matter how oligarchic in nature.

Scholars differ over how best to describe the gana sangha governments, and the vague, sporadic quality of the evidence allows for wide disagreements. Some emphasize the central role of the assemblies and thus tout them as democracies; other scholars focus on the upper-class domination of the leadership and possible control of the assembly and see an oligarchy or an aristocracy.

Another issue is the persistence of the four-tiered Varna class system. The duties and privileges on the members of each particular caste - rigid enough to prohibit someone sharing a meal with those of another order - might have affected the roles members were expected to play in the state, regardless of the formality of the institutions. The absence of any concrete notion of citizen equality across these varna system boundaries leads many scholars to claim that the true nature of gana sanghas is not comparable to truly democratic institutions. According to Thapar, there were only two classes in gana-sanghas, the kshatriya rajakula and the dasa-karmakara. The Kshatriyas of gana-sanghas did not follow the historical Vedic religion, which lead one Brahmin-authored source to call them degenerate Kshatriyas or Shudras. The dasa-karmakara composed of domestic slaves and hired labourers who worked the land.

See also 
 Janapada
 Mahajanapada
 Magadha-Vajji war
 History of India
 Monarchy in ancient India

References

Further reading 
 
 

Ancient India
Local government in India
Oligarchy
Republic